The Bandar Baharu District (colloquially Bandaq Baqhu or Bandaq Baru; once proposed to be renamed as Bandar Crustacea) is a town, district and state assembly constituency at the southernmost end of Kedah, Malaysia.

Due to its closer proximity to Penang, Bandar Baharu is also part of Greater Penang, Malaysia's second largest conurbation, with the town's logistical needs being met by Penang's well-developed transportation infrastructure.

The Bandar Baharu District Council (Majlis Daerah Bandar Baharu, MDBB) administers the whole Bandar Baharu district. It covers an area as wide as 169.3 km2 and consists of seven sub-districts which are Serdang, Kuala Selama, Sungai Batu, Bagan Samak, Permatang Pasir, Sungai Kecil Ilir and Relau. Serdang, a 20 km drive away from the actual Bandar Baharu town, is the administrative town of Bandar Baharu district. It is the southernmost and second smallest local government area in Kedah.

Bandar Baharu district have

borders with  South Seberang Perai in the east, Larut, Matang and Selama and Kerian districts in the south and Kulim district in the north.

Administrative divisions

Bandar Baharu District is divided into 6 mukims, which are:
 Bagan Samak
 Relau
 Selama
 Serdang
 Sungai Batu
 Sungai Kechil Hlir

Sub-districts

Serdang
Serdang 
Taman Serdang  
Taman Aked  
Taman Cempaka  
Taman Kenanga  
Taman Melur 
Perumahan Awam 1  
Perumahan Awam 2 
Kampung Sungai Punti 
Kampung Ayer Itam 
Kampung Badlisha 
Kampung Bangol Durian  
Kampung Bangol Limau  
Kampung Baru Serdang  
Kampung Batu 8 
Kampung Batu 10 
Kampung Batu 12  
Kampung Batu 16
Kampung Batu 18  
Kampung Batu Ayer Putih 
Kampung Batu Hampar 
Kampung Batu Lintang 
Kampung Bendang Sera 
Kampung Bukit Aping 
Kampung Bulikt Buluh 
Kampung Cina 
Kampung Chelong 
Kampung Durian Burung 
Kampung Ee Guan 
Kampung Jalan Selama 
Kampung Jermai 
Kampung Kuala Air Puteh 
Kampung Kuala Dingin 
Kampung Leret  
Kampung Medan  
Kampung Paya Salak 
Kampung Pekan Lama 
Kampung Setali 
Kampung Sungai Buluh 
Kampung Sungai Kasai
Kampung Sungai Saleh 
Kampung Sungai Setol 
Kampung Sungai Taka 
Kampung Sungai Tegas 
Kampung Sungai Tegas Terap 
Kampung Telok Kelian 
Kampung Telok Sera 
Kampung Tengah 
Kampung Terap 
Kampung Titi Akar 
Ladang Chim Khoon 
Ladang Somme
Ulu Riau

Bagan Samak
Bandar Baharu
Kampong Permatang Kerat Telunjuk 
Kampong Baru Bagan Samak 
Kampung Kubu, Parit Nibong 
Kampung Sg. Tepus/Pasir Debu 
Kampung Bukit Aping 
Kampung Parit Teropong 
Kampung Sg. Kechil Ulu 
Kampung Parit Nibong/Asam Kumbang 
Kampung Bagan Samak 
Kampung Rumah Murah/Tebuk Mat Rashid 
Kampung Lubok Buntar 
Kampung Berjaya Batu 26 
Kampung Permatang Simpor
Kampung Permatang Pasir
Taman Berlian Indah
Taman Cahaya Nilam
Taman Cahaya Intan
Taman Kelisa Emas
Taman Impian Casa Mutiara
Taman Cahaya Kristal
Taman Sejahtera
Taman Sentosa

Sungai Batu
Kampung Kuala Dingin 
Kampung Sg. Itam Dalam 
Kampung Sg. Tengas 
Kampung Terap Dalam 
Kampung Seribu Relong  
Kampung Baru Selama 
Kampung Selama Luar 
Kampung Sungai Tengas Ilir
Kampung Chong Meng

Relau
Kampong Tengah Relau 
Kampong Ulu/Relau 
Kampong Padang 
Kampong Sungai Rambai
Kampong 300 Kaki Relau
Kampong Kilang Batu
Kampong Paya Semambu
Taman Relau Indah

Sungai Kechil Ilir
Kampung Belakang Pekan (Kampung Masjid) 
Kampung Keda 
Kampung Balai Lama
Kampung Padang

Demographics

Banks
Hong Leong Bank

Tourism And Recreation 

Seri Tasik Park
This park was originally an inactive mine. Council's party has found its potential to be developed as a recreation garden since it is situated in the midst of Serdang town. Currently, this area already has children playground and exercise equipment. The budget was allocated from National Landscaping Department. District council has also received budget from Ministry of Culture, Art and Tourism of Malaysia this year to upgrade present components. This includes building new wakaf, providing picnic tables and chairs, building concrete bridges to link two lakes, pedestrian pathway and decorative lights around the park.
Council's party also planned to build rest house and floating restaurant to attract tourist to visit Seri Tasik Park.
With all the implemented plans and ideas, Council party hopes that Seri Tasik Park will attract tourist attention to this district in the future.
Batu Hampar Recreation Jungle Air Puteh, Serdang
Kerian River Bank
Sawah Padi
Bagan Samak

Federal Parliament and State Assembly Seats

Transportation

Car
PLUS  exit 153 serves Bandar Baharu.

Public transportation
KTM Intercity does not serve Bandar Baharu. The closest station is in Parit Buntar, Perak.

References

External links
 MDBB
 District Map
 Map
 Bandar Baharu District
 Serdang Fire Station